A schooner is a type of sailing vessel defined by its rig: fore-and-aft rigged on all of two or more masts and, in the case of a two-masted schooner, the foremast generally being shorter than the mainmast. A common variant, the topsail schooner also has a square topsail on the foremast, to which may be added a topgallant. Differing definitions leave uncertain whether the addition of a fore course would make such a vessel a brigantine. Many schooners are gaff-rigged, but other examples include Bermuda rig and the staysail schooner.

History
The origins of schooner rigged vessels is obscure, but there is good evidence of them from the early 17th century in paintings by Dutch marine artists. The name "schooner" first appeared in eastern North America in the early 1700s. The name may be related to a Scots word meaning to skip over water, or to skip stones. The earliest known illustration of a schooner depicts a yacht owned by the mayors (dutch: burgemeesters) of Amsterdam, drawn by the Dutch artist Rool and dated 1600. Later examples show schooners (dutch: schoeners) in Amsterdam in 1638 and New Amsterdam in 1627. Paintings by Van de Velde (1633–1707) and an engraving by Jan Kip of the Thames at Lambeth, dated 1697, suggest that schooner rig was common in England and Holland by the end of the 17th century. The Royal Transport was an example of a large British-built schooner, launched in 1695 at Chatham. 

The schooner rig was used in vessels with a wide range of purposes. On a fast hull, good ability to windward was useful for privateers, blockade runners, slave ships, smaller naval craft and opium clippers. Packet boats (built for the fast conveyance of passengers and goods) were often schooners. Fruit schooners were noted for their quick passages,  taking their perishable cargoes on routes such as the Azores to Britain. Some pilot boats adopted the rig. The fishing vessels that worked the Grand Banks of Newfoundland were schooners, and held in high regard as an outstanding development of the type. In merchant use, the ease of handling in confined waters and smaller crew requirements made schooners a common rig, especially in the 19th century. Some schooners worked on deep sea routes. In British home waters, schooners usually had cargo-carrying hulls that were designed to take the ground in drying harbours (or, even, to unload dried out on an open beach). The last of these once-common craft had ceased trading by the middle of the 20th century. Some very large schooners with five or more masts were built in the United States from circa 1880–1920. They mostly carried bulk cargoes such as coal and timber. In yachting, schooners predominated in the early years of the America's Cup. In more recent times, schooners have been used as sail training ships.

The type was further developed in British North America starting around 1713. In the 1700s and 1800s in what is now New England and Atlantic Canada schooners became popular for coastal trade, requiring a smaller crew for their size compared to then traditional ocean crossing square rig ships, and being fast and versatile. Three-masted schooners were introduced around 1800.

Schooners were popular on both sides of the Atlantic in the late 1800s and early 1900s. By 1910, 45 five-masted and 10 six-masted schooners had been built in Bath, Maine and in towns on Penobscot Bay. The Thomas W. Lawson was the only seven-masted schooner built.

Rig types
The rig is rarely found on a hull of less than 50 feet LOA, and small schooners are generally two-masted. In the two decades around 1900, larger multi-masted schooners were built in New England and on the Great Lakes with four, five, six, or even, seven masts. Schooners were traditionally gaff-rigged, and some schooners sailing today are reproductions of famous schooners of old, but modern vessels tend to be Bermuda rigged (or occasionally junk-rigged). While a sloop rig is simpler and cheaper, the schooner rig may be chosen on a larger boat so as to reduce the overall mast height and to keep each sail to a more manageable size, giving a mainsail that is easier to handle and to reef. An issue when planning a two-masted schooner's rig is how to fill the space between the masts: for instance, one may adopt (i) a gaff sail on the foremast (even with a bermuda mainsail), or (ii) a main staysail, often with a fisherman topsail to fill the gap at the top in light airs.

Various types of schooners are defined by their rig configuration. Most have a bowsprit although some were built without one for crew safety, such as Adventure.

The following varieties were built:

 Grand Banks fishing schooner: similar to Bluenose, includes a gaff topsail on the main mast and a fisherman's staysail. In the winter this would sail as a two-masted fishing schooner, without topmasts and their upper sails.
 Topsail schooner/Square topsail schooner: includes square topsails. A version with raked masts and known for its great speed, called the Baltimore Clipper was popular in the early 1800s.
 Four to six masted schooners: these designs spread the sail area over many smaller sails, at a time when sails were hoisted by hand, though mechanical assistance was used as the ships, sails, and gaffs became too large and heavy to raise manually. These were used for coastal trade on the Atlantic coast of North America, the West Indies, South America, and some trans-Atlantic voyages.
 Tern schooner: a three masted schooner very popular between 1880 and 1920. Wawona, the largest ever built, sailed on the West Coast of the United States from 1897 to 1947.

Uses
Schooners were built primarily for cargo, passengers, and fishing. 

The Norwegian polar schooner Fram was used by both Fridtjof Nansen and Roald Amundsen in their explorations of the poles.

Bluenose was both a successful fishing boat and a racer. America, eponym of America's Cup, was one of the few schooners ever designed for racing. This race was long dominated by schooners. Three-masted schooner Atlantic set the transatlantic sailing record for a monohull in the 1905 Kaiser's Cup race. The record remained unbroken for nearly 100 years.

Gallery

Sail plans

Examples

See also
 List of schooners

References

External links 
 Nova Scotia Schooner Association

Merchant sailing ship types
Naval sailing ship types
Sailing rigs and rigging
Dutch inventions
Ship designs of the Dutch Republic
Pirate ships
Articles containing video clips